Nikkala is a locality situated in Haparanda Municipality, Norrbotten County, Sweden with 435 inhabitants in 2010.

References

External links
https://web.archive.org/web/20080917015624/http://www.nikkala.haparanda.se/info.htm

Populated places in Haparanda Municipality
Norrbotten